Ban Huat is a tambon (subdistrict) of Ngao District, in Lampang Province, Thailand. In 2020 it had a total population of 4,878 people.

Administration

Central administration
The tambon is subdivided into 6 administrative villages (muban).

Local administration
The whole area of the subdistrict is covered by the subdistrict administrative organization (SAO) Ban Huat (องค์การบริหารส่วนตำบลบ้านหวด).

References

External links
Thaitambon.com on Ban Huat

Tambon of Lampang province
Populated places in Lampang province